Aosdána
 Arts Council of Ireland
 Chester Beatty Library
 The Civic
 Cork Opera House
 Culture Ireland
 Druid Theatre, Galway
 Dublin Writers Museum
 The Helix, performing arts centre, Dublin
 Hugh Lane Municipal Gallery, Dublin
 The Hunt Museum, Limerick
 Irish Georgian Society
 Irish Institute of Hellenic Studies at Athens (IIHSA)
 Irish Museum of Modern Art (IMMA), at Royal Hospital Kilmainham
 Irish National Botanic Gardens
 James Joyce Centre
 Macnas, performance arts company, Galway
 Mermaid County Wicklow Arts Centre
 National Archives of Ireland
 National Concert Hall
 National Gallery of Ireland
 National Library of Ireland
 National Museum of Ireland
 National Photographic Archive
 National Theatre Society, Abbey Theatre
 National Wax Museum
 Royal Dublin Society, RDS
 Royal Hibernian Academy, (RHA)
 Royal Irish Academy
 Royal Irish Academy of Music
 Royal Society of Antiquaries of Ireland
 State Heraldic Museum
 Taibhdhearc na Gaillimhe, Irish language theatre, Galway
 University Concert Hall, Limerick

See also
Museums in the Republic of Ireland
List of Irish learned societies

Institutions
Cultural institutions
Cultural